Dorien Wamelink (born 24 December 1970) is a Dutch former professional tennis player.

She has career-high WTA rankings of 252 in singles, achieved on 15 July 1991, and 253 in doubles, reached on 15 July 1991. Her only WTA Tour main-draw appearance came at the 1991 Pilkington Glass Championships Wamelink, where she came through qualifying to make the main draw. She defeated by Puerto Rican Gigi Fernández in the first round she was defeated by  in straight sets.

ITF finals

Singles: 2 (2–0)

Doubles: 4 (3–1)

References

External links 
 
 

1970 births
Living people
Dutch female tennis players
20th-century Dutch women
21st-century Dutch women